William Chrystie Miller (August 10, 1843 – September 23, 1922) was an American silent film actor. He appeared in 139 films between 1908 and 1914. Miller frequently appeared in films directed by D.W. Griffith and was known to film audiences as the "Grand Old Man of the Photodrama". 

On Broadway, Miller played Heinrich in The Devil (1908). He was born in Dayton, Ohio and died in Staten Island, New York.

Selected filmography

Judith of Bethulia (1914)
The Battle at Elderbush Gulch (1913)
The Stopped Clock (1913)
A Timely Interception (1913)
Just Gold (1913)
The Unwelcome Guest (1913)
A Welcome Intruder (1913)
A Girl's Stratagem (1913)
Oil and Water (1913)
A Misappropriated Turkey (1913)
An Adventure in the Autumn Woods (1913)
Pirate Gold (1913)
 The Tender Hearted Boy (1913)
 The Little Tease (1913)
A Sailor's Heart (1912)
The Informer (1912)
My Baby (1912)
The Chief's Blanket (1912)
Two Daughters of Eve (1912)
Blind Love (1912)
A Change of Spirit (1912)
The Sands of Dee (1912)
The Spirit Awakened (1912)
A Temporary Truce (1912)
An Outcast Among Outcasts (1912)
The Goddess of Sagebrush Gulch (1912)
Under Burning Skies (1912)
The Old Bookkeeper (1912)
The Battle (1911)
The Blind Princess and the Poet (1911)
The Last Drop of Water (1911)
The Smile of a Child (1911)
The White Rose of the Wilds (1911)
The New Dress (1911)
The Lonedale Operator (1911)
Was He a Coward? (1911)
The Lily of the Tenements (1911)
Fisher Folks (1911)
What Shall We Do with Our Old? (1911)
His Trust (1911)
The Lucky Toothache (1910)
In the Border States (1910)
Ramona (1910)
The Two Brothers (1910)
The Rocky Road (1910)
 The Modern Prodigal (1910)
The Day After (1909)
To Save Her Soul (1909)
In Little Italy (1909)
A Trap for Santa (1909)
A Corner in Wheat (1909)
The Red Man's View (1909)
The Zulu's Heart (1908)

References

External links

1843 births
1922 deaths
American male film actors
American male silent film actors
Male actors from Dayton, Ohio
20th-century American male actors